Stegasta variana is a species of moth of the family Gelechiidae. It is found in Queensland, China, India, Malaysia, Réunion and Africa.

The forewings are dark coppery-fuscous with a ferruginous-orange fascia at one-fourth, extended as a thick irregular streak along the dorsum to near the tornus. There are four irregular pale golden-metallic fasciae, with the costal extremities white, the first two margining the orange fascia, the third median, enclosing a dot of ground colour above the middle, the fourth at three-fourths, terminating above in a large quadrate ochreous-white spot. The hindwings are grey.

Foodplants
This species feeds on Caesalpiniaceae, Fabaceae and Oleaceae species.

References

Stegasta
Moths of Australia
Moths described in 1904
Moths of Africa
Moths of Asia